Westland Mall is an enclosed shopping mall in West Burlington, Iowa. Opened in 1977, the mall's anchor stores are Westland Theatre, and Marshalls. There are 2 vacant anchor stores that were once JCPenney and  Younkers. It is owned by Kohan Retail Investment Group.

History
General Growth Properties began building Westland Mall in 1976. Original tenants included JCPenney, Younkers, Woolworth, Kirlin's Hallmark, County Seat, Karmelkorn, Bresler's Ice Cream, and Osco Drug. The mall opened for business on March 30, 1977, comprising more than 40 stores. In 1981, Woolworth converted the store to its Woolco division,  before closing it in 1983. The space was later occupied by a furniture store.

L&H Realty bought the mall in 1998, and sold it to GK Development in 2004. Marshalls opened an anchor store at the mall in October 2013. In 2015, JCPenney announced that it would close its Westland Mall store along with 38 other stores in the United States, The store closed in spring 2015, in 2018 Younkers closed due to The Bon Ton bankruptcy.

In the former Hallmark location in the mall, Sears Hometown Store opened up there as of April 2022.

References

External links
Official website

Shopping malls in Iowa
Shopping malls established in 1977
Buildings and structures in Des Moines County, Iowa
1977 establishments in Iowa
Kohan Retail Investment Group